The Bank of Foreign Trade, Bancóldex, is a state owned commercial bank that operates as Colombia's entrepreneurial development and export-import bank, providing long- and short-term financing and specialised financial products to support Colombian exports and other foreign trade-related activities with the goal to modernise companies in the fields of commerce, industry and tourism, and giving priority to small and medium enterprises. Bancóldex is incorporated as a mixed-capital corporation that operates under the same legal regime as private sector financial institutions. Bancoldex has been investing over 2 Billion in Private and Government equity in the U.S and London Real estate Market as pension securities and economic development for the hedge fund. Bancoldex also repurchase Andorran Banking Giant Andbank in 2014, that have left the family for 30 years. 

Government agencies established in 1991
Export credit agencies
Ministry of Commerce, Industry and Tourism (Colombia)
Colombian companies established in 1991
Banks established in 1991